In 1942 under German occupation most pre-war Latvian football clubs were restored (with the exception of ethnic minorities' sides like RKSB Riga, Hakoah Riga etc.). The championship was divided in two phases - the preliminary phase to determine the four strongest sides in Riga and two in the province, and the main phase where these six teams would settle among them positions in the Latvian Higher League.

The four clubs to finish at the top of the Riga tournament were (from first to fourth) Daugavieši, RSK Riga (later in the year renamed back to ASK Riga), LDzB Riga and RFK. From the province an automatic qualification was granted to Olimpija Liepāja, whilst Jelgavas Sporta biedrība took the second spot.

Three sides were considered main contenders for the league title - Daugavieši, ASK and Olimpija, whilst RFK had an outside chance for it. After the first two match days results corresponded to the pre-season predictions: Daugavieši and ASK were on top of the table with 3 points, thus showing their ambitions to win the league. However, in the following three match days their results went in opposite directions - ASK got 3 victories, meanwhile Daugavieši suffered three defeats. The collapse of the Riga qualification tournament winners was mainly connected with loss of several key players during the season and before it. Alfons Jēgers, one of the most talented Latvian forwards of the 1940s, was arrested by the German officials and sent to a concentration camp, another key forward Ludvigs Putniņš decided to return to his previous club - ASK, several players suffered injuries and a result of it all Daugavieši finished last in the league and had to participate in a play-off match against Rīgas Vilki for the right to play in the higher league in the following season. By losing that game also, Daugavieši faced relegation.

Meanwhile, in the title race there was no competition for ASK Riga which won four out of five league games.

Final classification

Top goalscorers
6 goals
 Eduards Freimanis (Daugavieši)
5 goals
 Arnolds Puriņš (ASK)
4 goals
 Riekstiņš (ASK)
 Aleksandrs Vanags (ASK)
 Roberts Heiblihs (Olimpija Liepāja)
3 goals
 Ansons (Jelgavas Sporta biedrība)
 Vaclavs Borduško (ASK)
 Ēriks Koņeckis (ASK)

References and sources
 Sporta pasaule sports magazine, Rīga, 1942

1942
Higher League
Latvia